Collpacaca (possibly from Quechua qullpa salty, salpeter, qaqa rock, "salpeter rock") is a mountain in the Vilcanota mountain range in the Andes of Peru, about  high. It is located in the Cusco Region, Quispicanchi Province, Marcapata District. It is situated northwest of Juchuy Ananta and northeast of Chumpe and Huiscachani. The Huiscachani River flows along its western slope.

References

Mountains of Cusco Region
Mountains of Peru